Ladislav Petráš (born 1 December 1946) is a former Slovak football player. He played 19 matches for Czechoslovakia national team and scored six goals. Petráš was a participant at the 1970 FIFA World Cup, where he played three matches and scored two goals. Petráš also took part in the Euro 1976, where his team won the tournament. After scoring Czechoslovakia's only goal against Brazil, Petráš celebrated kneeling and doing the sign of the cross, demonstrating his Catholic faith in defiance against the Communist regime in Czechoslovakia, which was contrary to any religious belief. Petras continues to be a Roman Catholic. In the second match of the tournament, Petráš scored the first goal of the match against Romania at the 4th minute.

Domestically Petráš played for Dukla Banská Bystrica and later for Inter Bratislava.

References

External links
 
 
 
 
  

1946 births
Living people
People from Prievidza
Sportspeople from the Trenčín Region
1970 FIFA World Cup players
Czechoslovak footballers
Czechoslovakia international footballers
FK Inter Bratislava players
Slovak footballers
Slovak Roman Catholics
Olympic footballers of Czechoslovakia
Footballers at the 1968 Summer Olympics
UEFA Euro 1976 players
UEFA European Championship-winning players
Slovak football managers
Slovakia national under-21 football team managers
FK Inter Bratislava managers
Association football forwards
FK Dukla Banská Bystrica players
FC Baník Prievidza players
Wiener AC players
Expatriate footballers in Austria
Czechoslovak expatriate sportspeople in Austria
SK Vorwärts Steyr players